Bertrand Goldberg (July 17, 1913 – October 8, 1997) was an American architect and industrial designer, best known for the Marina City complex in Chicago, Illinois, the tallest reinforced concrete building in the world at the time of completion.

Life and career
Goldberg was born in Chicago, and trained at the Cambridge School of Landscape Architecture (now part of Harvard University). At age eighteen, in 1932, he went to Germany to study at the Bauhaus, working in the small office of architect Ludwig Mies van der Rohe. Following civil unrest in Berlin, Goldberg fled to Paris in 1933 and soon returned to Chicago, where he first worked for modernist architects Keck and Keck, Paul Schweikher, and Howard T. Fisher. Goldberg opened his own architectural office in Chicago in 1937.

Goldberg was known for innovative structural solutions to complex problems, particularly for residential, institutional, and industrial design projects. One of Goldberg's first commissions, in 1938, was for the North Pole chain of ice cream shops. His ingenious design allowed the small shops to be disassembled, transported, and reassembled with little effort. Its flat roof was supported by tension wires from a single, illuminated column rising up through the shop's center; glass windows and a door formed a box below the roof.

During his career, Goldberg designed a rear-engine automobile, canvas houses, unique furniture, prefabricated houses, and mobile vaccine laboratories for the United States government. He collaborated on some projects with his friend and fellow 'design scientist' R. Buckminster Fuller, as well as other modernists.  Goldberg's experimental plywood boxcars, demountable housing units for military use during and after World War II, led him to seek unconventional forms through mundane materials such as plywood and concrete. In the late 1930s, Goldberg was present at the famous meeting of Frank Lloyd Wright and Ludwig Mies van der Rohe at Taliesin. He also was friends with Josef Albers, who taught him at the Bauhaus.

In 1946, he married Nancy Florsheim, granddaughter of Milton S. Florsheim; they had two daughters, Lisa (born 1950) and Nan (born 1952), and one son, Geoffrey (born 1955).

Marina City 

Perhaps his best-known commission, Marina City in Chicago (1961–1964), incorporated many different functions into a mixed use complex of five buildings. The two sixty-story towers are on the river's edge, and are well known Chicago features, with striking multi-lobed columnar forms often described as "corn cobs". In addition to the towers, comprising apartments and parking, there was a complex pattern of activities that were incorporated into the original design, including an office building, theater, public pedestrian plaza, an active rail line, a marina, an ice skating rink, and a bowling alley.  Much of the complex has evolved and changed over time, and the pattern of activities has shifted significantly, but with only minor changes to Goldberg's design.  The office building is now a hotel, and the theater is now the Chicago House of Blues. The rail line has since been abandoned, and the skating rink has been covered by a later addition housing a steakhouse.

After the success of Marina City, Goldberg undertook many more large commissions for hospitals with similar structural features, such as the now demolished Prentice Women's Hospital for Northwestern University, science and medical complexes for SUNY Stony Brook, and the Good Samaritan Hospital in Phoenix, Arizona. Other work includes schools and other public institutional buildings such as River City and the Hilliard Homes public housing complex, both in Chicago.

After Marina City, Goldberg moved his work to focus on larger scale social, planning, and engineering issues, and proposed many progressive urban projects.  Goldberg also wrote extensively on urban issues and other historical and cultural issues.

The Bertrand Goldberg Archive is held by the Ryerson & Burnham Libraries at the Art Institute of Chicago.  The archive includes photographs, drawings, correspondence, and audiovisual materials.

Work 

Goldberg's work includes:

Harriet Higginson house in Wooddale, Illinois
  Dr. Aaron Heimbach House, Blue Island, Illinois, 1939
  John M. van Beuren House, Morristown, New Jersey (with mural by T. Lux Feininger), 1955
  Levin House, Flossmoor, Illinois, 1956
  Pineda Island Resort, Spanish Fort, Alabama, 1959
  Astor Tower Hotel, Chicago, 1963
  West Palm Beach Christian Convention Center, West Palm Beach, Florida, 1965
  Hilliard Towers Apartments, Chicago, 1966 
  Elgin Mental Health Center, Elgin, Illinois, 1967
  St. Joseph Medical Center, Tacoma, Washington, 1969
  Prentice Women's Hospital Building, Chicago, 1975 (demolished 2013)
  Stony Brook University Hospital, Stony Brook, New York, 1976-1980
  Good Samaritan Hospital (now Banner - University Medical Center Phoenix), Phoenix, Arizona, 1982
  Providence Hospital, Mobile, Alabama, 1987
  master plan and buildings for the campus of Wilbur Wright College, Chicago, 1993

References
Bibliography
 Jay Pridmore, George A. Larson, Chicago Architecture and Design : Revised and expanded, Harry N. Abrams, Inc., New York, 2005. .

Notes

External links

 Forgotten Chicago series on Bertrand Goldberg
 Oral history interview with Bertrand Goldberg
  Website on Bertrand Goldberg
 Bertrand Goldberg Archive

1913 births
1997 deaths
Artists from Chicago
20th-century American architects
Jewish American artists
Jewish architects
Bauhaus alumni
Harvard Graduate School of Design alumni
Illinois Institute of Technology alumni
Florsheim family